Stupid Man, Smart Phone is a British reality TV series which sees Russell Kane dropped into a different, treacherous environment every episode. Kane and a guest must survive with no training or knowledge of the local language or customs, only their mobile phones.

Commissioned by BBC Three and BBC Worldwide, it is a co-production from Kalel Productions and Second Star, part of Objective Media Group. It aired on BBC Three and BBC Two in May 2016.

The Guardian described it as "entertaining (and) amusing", and preferable to Bear Grylls.

Episodes
 Morocco
 Norway
 Costa Rica: Jungle
 Italy
 Poland
 Costa Rica: Desert Island

References

External links
 
 

2016 British television series debuts
2016 British television series endings
2010s British reality television series
2010s British travel television series
BBC reality television shows
English-language television shows
Television series by All3Media
Television shows set in Costa Rica
Television shows set in Italy
Television shows set in Morocco
Television shows set in Norway
Television shows set in Poland
Television shows set in the Arctic